The Revolutionary Communist Party, USA (also known as RCP and The Revcoms) is a communist party in the United States founded in 1975 and led by its chairman, Bob Avakian. The party organizes for a revolution to overthrow the system of capitalism and replace it with a socialist state, with the final aim of world communism. The RCP is frequently described as a cult, a characterization to which it strongly objects.

History

1960s–1970s
In early 1968, Avakian, Leibel Bergman, H. Bruce Franklin, Stephen Charles Hamilton and a score or so others—comprising both veterans of the Communist Party USA and Bay Area radicals based in Palo Alto, Berkeley, and San Francisco, formed the Bay Area Revolutionary Union (BARU). Among the BARU's first tasks was to challenge the Maoist Progressive Labor Party (PLP) over its positions on the Black Panther Party, the Chinese Cultural Revolution and the direction of Maoism. The early RU joined with the Revolutionary Youth Movement faction in the Students for a Democratic Society (SDS) in opposing PLP's role in SDS at its national convention in Chicago in 1969. The resulting split led to PL controlling the SDS name, while RYM split into two factions.

In 1971, Franklin led a more militant faction of BARU out the organization to join Venceremos. The RU continued to expand, uniting collectives across the country and becoming a national organization with the long-term goal to form a new communist party. The new nationwide structure induced BARU to change its name to simply the Revolutionary Union (RU). Avakian was elected to the central committee of the RU shortly thereafter. The RCP claims that of the various groups coming out of SDS, it was the first to seriously attempt to develop itself at the theoretical level, with the publication of Red Papers 1. In 1974, RU started publication of its newspaper Revolution (renamed Revolutionary Worker, and adopting a weekly format in 1979).

In 1973, the anti-war group Vietnam Veterans Against the War (VVAW) entered into reforms after the end of the Vietnam War, including an explicitly anti-imperialist stance and opening its membership to civilians. During this period, the RU became a popular faction within the VVAW, reaching its peak in 1975, when the RU-controlled national office voted to remove members, expel chapters and place the organization into ideological uniformity. After the integration, RU reconstituted itself as the Revolutionary Communist Party (RCP).

After the death of Mao in 1976, the RCP split, with about 40% of its membership leaving, over which position to take in relation to the new Chinese leadership. Avakian led the majority of the party that rejected what it analyzed as a counterrevolutionary coup against Mao's allies. After this split, Avakian wrote and published the book Mao Tsetung's Immortal Contributions, which summarizes the developments of Maoism.

In January 1979, Avakian and 78 other Party members and supporters were arrested and charged with various crimes in connection to a militant protest against Deng Xiaoping's visit to the White House. Seventeen demonstrators, including Avakian, were charged with multiple felonies that carried a combined sentence of up to 241 years. After the RCP and its supporters waged a mass campaign for political, legal, and other support for the defendants, the charges were dropped in 1982, by which time Party leadership had decided to go into exile, with Avakian applying for political asylum in France, where he remained for many years.

1980s–2000s

The RCP organized May Day 1980 rallies in 16 cities across the U.S., including Los Angeles, New York, Portland, Seattle, and Washington, D.C. Weeks before the May Day demonstrations, RCP member Damian Garcia and two others climbed the Alamo, tearing down the American flag from its pole, and raising the Red Flag in its place before being arrested. Shortly thereafter, on April 22, Garcia was stabbed to death while organizing in a Los Angeles housing project. At the time, police said that Garcia's murderer was gang-affiliated, while RCP insisted that he had been assassinated by the state in retaliation for his action at the Alamo. Avakian remarked in his memoir that Garcia's murder was "very clearly tied in with police agents ... it was an attack on our Party."

In 1984 Avakian and other members of the RCP co-founded the Revolutionary Internationalist Movement (RIM), a now-defunct international grouping of Maoist parties, which were united by a founding declaration upholding Marxism-Leninism-Maoism. Other participating parties in RIM included the Communist Party of Peru (Shining Path), the Union of Iranian Communists (Sarbedaran), and the Revolutionary Communist Group of Colombia. RIM published and distributed the magazine and news service A World to Win from 1981 to 2006. Since RIM's dissolution in the 2000s, the publication is updated only on its website. In 2017, A World to Win was restructured as "a more thorough-going tool for revolution based on Bob Avakian's new synthesis of communism."

Flag-burning by RCP members led to the Texas v. Johnson case, which established the burning of the American flag as a constitutionally protected right.

2010s
In 2011, RCP spokesperson Carl Dix and Cornel West co-initiated the campaigns to Stop "Stop and Frisk" and Stop Mass Incarceration. Dix and West appeared on Democracy Now! to discuss the state of Black America in the age of Obama. RCP organized Rise Up October against racism and police brutality; attendees included Quentin Tarantino.

In July 2016, mass protest and police arrests erupted over a flag-burning by the RCP outside the Republican National Convention before a crowd of thousands. The next week, the RCP staged another flag burning outside the Democratic National Convention after denouncing the United States. Later that year, in response to Donald Trump's tweet calling for the criminalization of flag burning, RCP supporters burned another American flag outside the Trump International Hotel in New York City.

In October 2016, RCP supporters were banned from the University of Chicago for trespassing after encouraging students to get organized with the revolutionaries, with one activist arrested by police; the next day, they returned to defy the ban, while denouncing U.S. elections and America.

In August 2016, the RCP led protesters in a two-day march on a barricaded police station after the fatal shooting of a black man by Milwaukee police; the police chief said the RCP had incited violence toward police.

RCP members handed out fliers outside the San Diego Levi's Stadium in support of Colin Kaepernick and NFL protests of the U.S. national anthem.

In December 2016, in response to the election of Donald Trump, the RCP helped initiate and lead the ad-hoc coalition Refuse Fascism, which had as its goal the prevention of Trump's inauguration through mass political protest and civil disobedience. After the inauguration, the organization adjusted to a mission of launching sustained mass protests aimed at forcing the removal of the Trump administration before the scheduled election of 2020.

In July 2018, Refuse Fascism and RCP organized 100 handmaids to protest U.S. Vice President Mike Pence in New York City, saying "[he] is a Christian fascist theocrat for whom the handmaid's tale is a model."

In October 2018, the RCP organized a demonstration in Chicago's Daley Plaza on the 23rd Annual "National Day of Protest to STOP Police Brutality," in response to the police murder of Laquan McDonald and other black youth.

During the Q&A at a February 2019 event at USC, RCP supporters sparked controversy after criticizing speaker Amanda Nguyen's work in the U.S. government during the War on Terror.

In March 2019, police detained a Revolution Newspaper correspondent on the anniversary of the police shooting of Stephon Clark, after the correspondent got into an argument with Al Sharpton while urging attendees to organize for revolution rather than political reforms.

On International Women's Day 2019, the Revolution Club joined supporters of the Communist Party of Iran (Marxist–Leninist–Maoist), to march through Westwood, California, calling for universal women's rights.

On Independence Day 2019, the RCP staged flag burnings at the U.S.–Mexico border and the White House, the latter being a demonstration against the "Salute to America" military parade, which resulted in two RCP supporters being attacked by the Proud Boys and arrested by Secret Service officers.

Political ideology 
The RCP originated as a Maoist political organization with roots in the New Left of the 1970s. In the 1990s, its political ideology was Marxism–Leninism–Maoism. Today, the framework for its political ideology is Avakian's "New Synthesis" (or "New Communism"), which it sees as an advancement of revolutionary theory; this has been debated among Maoists internationally. The RCP is atheist and claim to stress the scientific method.

RCP leadership says "the system cannot be reformed, it must be overthrown," and does not participate in charity or elections, instead organizing for total revolution, to replace the capitalist system with a socialist system aiming for communism worldwide. Its goal is not to "make America socialist" but instead "a world without America and everything it stands for."

Since the 2000s, Avakian's "new communism" is the RCP's ideological framework, which it considers a scientific advancement of Marxism–Leninism–Maoism. Before that, the party was a founding member of the Revolutionary Internationalist Movement.

Cult of personality

The RCP began developing a cult of personality around Avakian as part of the 1979 pivot catalyzed by the Deng Xiaoping protest trial. The goal was to both increase support for Avakian in the legal arena while also making RCP a more revolutionary organization, inspired by Stalin's rule, the Mao Zedong cult, and the more recent Free Huey! campaign in which Avakian and company had participated. Relying on the theory of Georgy Plekhanov and framing the development of a cult as a scientifically based organizational strategy, Avakian was put forward as a larger-than-life figure to revitalize the group.

Members of both the left and the broader public often see the RCP as a small cult around Avakian. This perception was noted in The Indypendent in 2014, Harper's in 2016, Mic in 2017, and Vice magazine in 2022. Members and groups on the left, in organized labor, and in protest movements have called RCP a cult. In 2016, former USLAW national coordinator Michael Eisenscher called RCP primarily "a cult around Avakian". In June 2022, a coalition of 23 abortion rights, feminist, and mutual-aid groups released a statement denouncing RCP and the affiliated organization Rise Up 4 Abortion Rights, including a description of RCP as a cult.

RCP members celebrate the organization as a cult of personality around Avakian. RCP publications say that the RCP and Avakian have encouraged controversy and serious debate over their views and a wide range of issues, engaging in numerous debates and polemics, while also taking a strong stand against destructive allegations in place of principled dialogue and building unity for what they term "the emancipation of humanity".

LGBT issues 
In the 1970s and 1980s, the RCP called homosexuality "petty bourgeois" and prohibited LGBT people from joining the party. This outlook coexisted with a public line against gay-bashing and attacks on homosexuals by religious bigots and fundamentalists, and was consistent with numerous groups of the New Communist movement and the broader Marxist–Leninist movement of the period. The party's policy against homosexuality ended in 2001. The RCP platform now demands full recognition of LGBT rights as a fundamental element of establishing socialism.

Activities 

The RCP releases daily updates online and a periodic print edition of its weekly newspaper, Revolution (formerly called Revolutionary Worker, 1979–2005), in English and Spanish.

In December 2016, party members and others co-initiated Refuse Fascism, a coalition group aiming to "drive out" the Trump administration through sustained street protests. InfoWars and other far-right conspiracy theory websites claimed the RCP and Refuse Fascism were organizing a military overthrow of the government on November 4, 2017. Several nationwide anti-Trump protest marches were organized for that day, numbering in the thousands.

Refuse Fascism protesters were arrested in September 2017 after blocking four lanes of the 101 Freeway in Los Angeles during rush hour, to "sound the alarm about fascism."

RCP supporters Michael Slate and Sunsara Taylor have regularly aired shows on radio networks KPFK and WBAI, respectively, where they discuss news and politics with guests.

Revolution Books 
RCP branches opened Revolution Books stores in major U.S. cities and became a frequent presence in protest movements.

Prison outreach 

The RCP runs the Prisoners Revolutionary Literature Fund, which sends its newspaper and other political works from its publishing press to hundreds of incarcerated people nationwide to spread a revolutionary message. As its aim, the fund "provides an educational opportunity for prisoners to engage with world events and key political, cultural, and philosophical questions from a unique communistic perspective, including discussions of morality, religion, science, and the arts centered around a positive socialist-light."

The RCP has faced increasing censorship by prison officials who seek to deny inmates access to revolutionary literature.

References

Further reading

Books 
 
 
The Red Paper I (1972)

External links 

 
COINTELPRO targets
Political parties established in 1975
1975 establishments in the United States
Anti-revisionist organizations
Communist parties in the United States
Maoist parties in the United States
Cults of personality